Vivian Gordon James "Viv" Jenkins (2 November 1911 – 5 January 2004) was a Welsh rugby union player who, having taught Classics and Games at Dover College, went on to have a successful career as a sports journalist. He won 14 caps for Wales and 1 cap for the British and Irish Lions. He also played first-class cricket with Glamorgan and Oxford University.

Early life
Jenkins was born in Port Talbot but grew up near Bridgend. He attended Llandovery College in Carmarthenshire and later Jesus College, Oxford.

Rugby career
Jenkins played rugby for Jesus College and represented the school's side at Twickenham on three occasions. In 1932, he was offered a chance to play for his home club Bridgend RFC in a tie against Newport RFC. His performances for Bridgend led to him receiving a call up to the Wales national rugby union team within a month to play against England on 21 January 1933. Wales won the match 7–3, the first time the side had won at Twickenham for 23 years.

The following year, Jenkins missed the opening match of the 1934 Home Nations Championship against England. He rejoined the side ahead of its victory over Scotland, in which he kicked two conversions, and became the first Welsh full back to score a try in an international fixture when he scored ran in a try against Ireland in the final match. In 1935, Jenkins and teammate Wilf Wooller inspired Wales to victory over New Zealand.

Jenkins was part of the 1938 British Lions tour to South Africa where he was named vice-captain to Sam Walker. Although disrupted by injury, he was the team's second-highest scorer with 50 points during the tour. He won his final cap for Wales the following year, in a 3–0 defeat to England.

Personal life
Jenkins married Susan Fraser in 1940 and the couple had one son together. His wife died in 1984. After graduating from Jesus College, Jenkins took up a teaching position at Dover College alongside his sporting career.

At the start of the Second World War, Jenkins joined the Territorial Army and served in the anti-aircraft command where he reached the rank of captain. After the war ended, Jenkins became a rugby reporter for the News of the World and later The Sunday Times. He served as the editor of Rothmans Rugby Yearbook for 11 years and wrote several books on the sport.

References

External links
 Cricinfo: Viv Jenkins
 Viv Jenkins at CricketArchive
 

1911 births
2004 deaths
Alumni of Jesus College, Oxford
Bridgend RFC players
British & Irish Lions rugby union players from Wales
Glamorgan cricketers
London Welsh RFC players
Oxford University cricketers
Oxford University RFC players
Rugby union fullbacks
Rugby union players from Port Talbot
Wales international rugby union players
Welsh cricketers
Welsh rugby union players
Welsh sportswriters